The 1988 U.S. Open was the 88th U.S. Open, held June 16–20 at The Country Club in Brookline, Massachusetts, a suburb southwest of Boston. Curtis Strange defeated Nick Faldo in an 18-hole playoff for the first of two consecutive U.S. Open titles.

Final round
Strange took the 54-hole lead after a third-round 69, while Faldo was a stroke behind after a 68. Strange and Faldo battled back-and-forth during the final round.

Playoff
In the playoff, Strange carried a one-stroke lead to the turn after birdies at the 4th and 7th holes. When Faldo bogeyed the 11th, the lead went to two, but Strange bogeyed the next hole to return it to one. Strange rebounded with a birdie on 13 and took a commanding three-shot lead when Faldo bogeyed. Faldo bogeyed three of his last four holes to card a 75, while Strange finished with an even-par 71 and a four-stroke victory.

This was the third U.S. Open at The Country Club and all ended in playoffs. Julius Boros, age 43, defeated Arnold Palmer and Jacky Cupit in 1963, and 20-year-old amateur Francis Ouimet prevailed over Britons Harry Vardon and Ted Ray in 1913.

Strange successfully defended his title in 1989, the first to win consecutive U.S. Opens since Ben Hogan in 1950 and 1951. Brooks Koepka became the first player since Strange to defend his title by winning the U.S. Open in 2017 at Erin Hills and again in 2018 at Shinnecock Hills.

Course

Composite Course

Source:

Past champions in the field

Made the cut

Missed the cut 

Source:

Round summaries

First round
Thursday, June 16, 1988

Source:

Second round
Friday, June 17, 1988

Defending champion Scott Simpson shot 66 (−5) to lead after 36 holes.

Source:

Amateurs: Mayfair (+1), Tolles (+14), Duncan (+15), Rintoul (+16)

Third round
Saturday, June 18, 1988

Source:

Final round
Sunday, June 19, 1988

Source:

Amateur: Billy Mayfair (+3)

Scorecard

Cumulative tournament scores, relative to par

Cumulative tournament scores, relative to par
Source:

Playoff
Monday, June 20, 1988

Scorecard

Cumulative playoff scores, relative to par
{|class="wikitable" span = 50 style="font-size:85%;
|-
|style="background: Pink;" width=10|
|Birdie
|style="background: PaleGreen;" width=10|
|Bogey
|}
Source:

References

External links
GolfCompendium.com – 1988 U.S. Open
USGA Championship Database

U.S. Open (golf)
U.S. Open (golf)
U.S. Open (golf)
Golf in Massachusetts
Events in Norfolk County, Massachusetts
U.S. Open (golf)
Sports competitions in Massachusetts
Sports in Brookline, Massachusetts
Tourist attractions in Brookline, Massachusetts
U.S. Open (golf)